Hai Tujhe Salaam India is an Indian political drama film written and directed by Avanish Kumar and produced by Arbaaz Bhatt under the banner Redwood Productions. It features Aarya Babbar, Ajaz Khan, and Smita Gondkar in lead roles. The film was released digitally on Hungama Play on 26 January 2022.

Cast 

 Aarya Babbar as Raquib
 Ajaz Khan as Goivinda
 Smita Gondkar as Zoya
 Salman Bhatt as David
 Kanwalpreet Singh as Happy
 Archana Prajapati as Archana
 Nishikant Dixit as Narang
 Gulshan Pandey as Janardhan
 Mir Sarwar as Pradhan
 Mushtaq Khan as Raman Ojha 
 Mir Umar as Vicky
 Banwari Lal Jhol Shukla ji
 Javed Rizvi as Aafat
 Deepak Sharma as Major Arun

Filming 
The shooting started in the spring of 2017. Some of the material was filmed at Indira Gandhi Memorial Tulip Garden. The main drama portion of the film was shoot in Mumbai at various studios.

Music

Track listing

References

External links 

2022 films
2020s Hindi-language films
Hindi-language drama films
Indian political drama films